Rosemary Rodriguez is an American film and television director. She directed the 2015 film Silver Skies starring George Hamilton.

Acts of Worship 
In 2001 Rodriguez wrote, produced and directed a feature film called Acts of Worship, about a young woman struggling with drug addiction. The film was nominated for, and won, numerous independent film awards as well as film festival awards.

Television career 
Rodriguez has worked as a director on many United States television series, including The Walking Dead, Third Watch, Law & Order, Rescue Me, Castle, Criminal Minds, Undercovers, Without a Trace, Elementary and Jessica Jones. Recently she has directed episodes of two CBS drama series: The Good Wife and Blue Bloods, as well as episode 2 in the 8th season and episode 4 of the 9th season of the AMC show The Walking Dead.

Filmography

Film

Television

References

External links 

American film directors
American television directors
American women film directors
American women television directors
Living people
Place of birth missing (living people)
Year of birth missing (living people)
Brandeis University alumni